= Shillong Observer =

The Shillong Observer was an English-language fortnightly newspaper published from Shillong, India. It was an organ of the Communist Party of India. Prafulla Misra was the editor of the newspaper.
